Albert Frost (19 March 1878 – 25 October 1951) was an Australian cricketer. He played three first-class matches for Tasmania between 1904 and 1908.

See also
 List of Tasmanian representative cricketers

References

External links
 

1878 births
1951 deaths
Australian cricketers
Tasmania cricketers
Cricketers from Launceston, Tasmania